Estonia and the United Kingdom are full members of the Council of Europe and NATO.

History

Pre-Soviet relations
The relationship between the UK and Estonia has its beginning during the Estonian War of Independence, when the UK sent a Royal Navy detachment led by Admiral E.A. Sinclair to defend Estonia's shores. The British seamen who gave their lives defending Estonia's freedom during the conflict were laid to rest in the Tallinn Military Cemetery.

Before the Soviet occupation in 1940, relations between the UK and Estonia were close. The UK was a major market for Estonian produce, more than 30% of Estonia's exports went to the UK. The United Kingdom never recognised Estonia's annexation in 1940.

Post-Soviet relations
The UK recognised the restoration of Estonian Independence on 27 August 1991. Diplomatic relations between the two countries were re-established on 5 September 1991, and the British Embassy opened in Tallinn in the same year. Estonia's relations with the UK are close. Britain provided both political and practical support to Estonia's efforts to join the EU and NATO.

Both Estonia and the United Kingdom provided contributions to the NATO mission in Afghanistan.

In October 2016 it was announced that 800 British troops would be stationed at Tapa Army Base in Estonia.

Cultural relations

The British Council has a representation in Tallinn. There is an active programme of English language teaching support, cultural exchange and scholarships for Estonian students to study in the UK.

Migration
An estimated 10,000-15,000 Estonian citizens live in the UK, about 3,000-5,000 of them in London. The most active communities are in London, Bradford and Leicester. There is a total of 13 Estonian societies in the UK, the oldest being the London Estonian Society established in 1921.

Tourism

Tallinn and Estonia's reputation as a tourist destination has grown in Great Britain over the past few years. Estonia's accession to the EU in 2004 gave a significant boost to reciprocal travel – that year 30% and the following year (2005) 60% more (62.3 thousand) British tourists were accommodated in Estonia than in previous years. In 2012 nearly 55 thousand British tourists used Estonian accommodation establishments. Tallinn has also become one of the most popular destinations among Baltic cruise ports. In 2012 over 75 000 British cruise tourists visited Estonia.

Reports of British tourists excessively drinking in Tallinn have received media coverage in the UK.

Economic relations
The UK is in 9th place among Estonia's trade partners, making up 3% of Estonia's total trade turnover. UK-Estonian trade was worth 790 million euros in 2012. As a foreign investor, the UK's interest in Estonia has been fairly great – it is the source of 2% of all foreign direct investments made in Estonia.

Diplomacy

Lauri Bambus was appointed Estonian ambassador to the United Kingdom in August 2014. Christopher Holtby was appointed British ambassador to Estonia in January 2012.

Estonia has an embassy in London and three honorary consulates (in Cheltenham, Paisley and Wales). The United Kingdom has an embassy in Tallinn.

Queen Elizabeth II of the United Kingdom paid a state visit to Estonia in October 2006.
Prince Harry also made an official visit in May 2014 and paid tribute to Estonia's war dead.

Leaders regularly meet as part of the Northern Future Forum.

See also

 Foreign relations of Estonia
 Foreign relations of the United Kingdom
 Embassy of Estonia, London
 List of Ambassadors of the United Kingdom to Estonia
 EU–UK relations

References

External links
  Estonian Ministry of Foreign Affairs about relations with the United Kingdom
  British Foreign and Commonwealth Office about relations with Estonia

 
Bilateral relations of the United Kingdom
United Kingdom